Sorin Hall, also known as Sorin College, is the oldest of the 32 Residence Halls on the campus of the University of Notre Dame and one of the 16 male dorms. It is named after Edward Sorin, the founder of Notre Dame. Sorin is located directly north of Walsh Hall and is directly south of the Basilica of the Sacred Heart. Sorin houses 143 undergraduate students. Sorin Hall is, along with other building on the Main Quad of Notre Dame, on the National Register of Historic Places. Sorin Hall was the first Notre Dame residential hall established as such, although St. Edward's Hall is housed in an older building.

History 

Sorin Hall was the first dormitory built specifically to host students at the University of Notre Dame. Prior to 1888, every college student was housed in the Main Building, with open dormitory areas. During the early mid-1880s, the Holy Cross priests experimented with private rooms for upper classmen with high academic grades and the results were positive. Since the Main Building was overcrowded with students, Father Edward Sorin decided to build a freestanding dormitory to expand residential space for students and alleviate the housing shortage. It was the first of its kind among all Catholic universities and one of the first among colleges across the country.  

It was designed by Willoughby J. Edbrooke, architect of the Main Building, Washington Hall (1881), and the Science Hall (1883 - today's LaFortune Student Center). His design has been described as a mixture of Gothic and Roman for a building that resembles a French chateau. groundbreaking took place 18 March 1897 and the cornerstone was laid by Fr. Edward Sorin, CSC  (founder of the university) on May 27, 1888, the fiftiest anniversary of his ordination as a priest. Originally intended to be called Collegiate Hall, when the cornerstone was uncovered for the ceremony, Father Sorin discovered that the dormitory was to be named in his honor.  Construction progressed throughout the fall of 1888 and the dorm opened its doors on New Year's Day of 1889. The 12 January 1889 issue of the Scholastic reported that "The house is replete with all the modern conveniences; and the rooms, fifty in number, are large enough to encourage study, and at the same time small enough to discourage visiting.”  The fifty rooms were all singles. Space for the law department, founded in 1866, was situated on the south side of the first floor; classes had previously been taught in the Main Building. The basement hosted a smoking room and a reading room for the comfort of students.Rev. Andrew Morrissey, C.S.C. (1860-1921) was the dorm's first rector. He would serve as the university's eighth president from 1893 to 1905. The rector's room was situated immediately north of the front door. Professor “Colonel” William Hoynes, chair of the law department and one of the early bachelor dons, was housed to the south of the front door. Two seminarians, who assisted Father Morrissey, also resided in the new building. Sorin hall's chapel, dedicated to St. Thomas Aquinas, was built on the north side of the building. James A Burns was rector for four years.

The structure as it exists today was renovated in 2021 with the addition of the 4th side to completely enclose the building and create a courtyard. Originally, the dorm did not have its now iconic front porch. In its early years, Sorin housed Notre Dame's law school and the dean of the law department, Prof.  William Hoynes, resided in the building.  He once happened to be the target of one of the numerous student pranks in the early 1900s who dumped buckets of water on people leaving the building. After the instance, he raised a fuss with university administration, hence a porch was built in April 1905 to avoid any such further instance.  Since then, the porch thus became one of the iconic features of the dorm. In the 1920s, Sorin hosted most of the school's football players.

During the Vietnam War, the men who resided in this dorm briefly decided to break away from the University of Notre Dame.  Students and professors held classes in the dorm and boycotted University events.  They hung a wooden sign above the porch, declaring the dorm "Sorin College."  The sign remains to this day and Secession Week, one of Sorin's three signature events, is an ongoing commemoration of this brief rebellion.

In 1988, Sorin Hall celebrated its 100th anniversary as a Notre Dame residence hall.

Notable former residents include former coaches Knute Rockne, Moose Krause, and player George Gipp. All four of the famed Four Horsemen of Notre Dame ( Harry Stuhldreher, Don Miller, Jim Crowley, and Elmer Layden) lived in Sorin Hall for at least one year during their college careers. Former university president Fr. Edward Malloy, C.S.C., has resided in the hall since 1979.

Traditions 
With its long history on Notre Dame's campus came a number of notable and unique traditions. The dorm's mascot is the Otter. Upon graduation, seniors carve their initials into the brick on the front porch.

Fr. Sorin's statue 

A bronze statue of Fr. Sorin resides in the front hallway. It is a replica of the large statue that was dedicated on the Main Quad on 3 May 1906. Sorin residents rub his feet for good luck when they pass by it. The statue has been the target of a number of Sorin resident pranks – it frequently disappeared for short periods of time. In January 1953, the statue had gone missing just before the Christmas break and that the Student Senate resolved to find the statue.  “Although traditionally a wanderer on the ND campus, Father Sorin’s present disappearance has lasted so long that concern is arising that it may be a permanent one” [Scholastic issue 01/16/1953, page 13].  Shortly thereafter, postcards and letters began coming in from the statue from destinations far and wide.  In some, that statue of Sorin claimed to have attended some of the year's most important events such as Dwight Eisenhower's Inauguration, Queen Elizabeth II's Coronation, and Josef Stalin's funeral.  The mystery persisted, until just before Commencement 1953, the statue arrived at Main Circle in a cab surrounded by a cheering crowd. It turned out that Alumnus Camillus Witzieben had found the statue in the snow, and instead of returning the statue to Sorin Hall, Witzieben and friend August Manier decided to bury the statue in a sand trap on the Golf Course  and later moved it to a house in Chicago until its triumphant return. In the meantime, their military friends sent the postcards from a variety of destinations around the world. In 1955, Sorin's once again wandered, and was brought to the Kentucky Derby.  He sent a telegram to Notre Dame saying “that he ‘lost it all on Nashua’ and was ‘returning home’ that night at 8 o’clock.”  The statue returned once again by car to Main Circle.

While the statue probably never went further than a Chicago basement, the journeys of Fr. Sorin became fabled around campus:  “I’d heard stories of seniors who took the statue around the world with them and sent back pictures of Sorin posed beside European landmarks, such as the Leaning Tower of Pisa and the Tower of London.  I’d heard he’d even had an audience with the Pope, and that he’d returned of the back of an elephant,” said alumnus Pat Williams, Class of 1963, in a 1984 Notre Dame Magazine article. Sorin's return during Homecoming Weekend in 1962 was the most elaborate of all:  dangling from a helicopter and met by Sorinites in togas and chariots.

Eventually, it was one taken by a student after graduation in 1966. When a priest of the Congregation, Father Burtachell, learned of its whereabouts, the statue was returned to campus in 1972 under the priest's direct supervision. When the hall was renovated in 1983, Burtachell returned the statue to Sorin Hall under better security. The hollow statue was filled with concrete and connected to a base with steel rods, which were in turn soldered to the floor in the main entrance.

Other traditions

Sorin Hall, led by president Aidan McKiernan and vice president Tristan Hunt, began boycotting Notre Dame pep rallies in the fall of 2008. The Otters stated that this was in protest of changes to the rally format brought on by commercialization and a desire to include alumni in what was once mainly a student activity. Instead of attending the rally, the Otters would wait outside and cheer the team as it went in.

Sorin does not have any natural rivals among the men's residence halls on campus, due to its location and tradition of independence. In contrast to other men's dorms, with their chants of "[men's dorm] loves [women's dorm]" Otters chant "Sorin loves Sorin."

Sorin is the only dormitory on campus to have its own walking tour, highlighting many of the historically interesting rooms and areas that throughout the course of its history have either been the home to important Notre Dame individuals, as with room 011, the "Captain's Corner", or institutions, as with the first floor wing that at one time housed Notre Dame Law School. Additionally, Sorin is the only dorm to boast its own boxing practice room.  Many Otters participate in Bengal Bouts, the university boxing program that raises money for Notre Dame charities in Bangladesh.

Notable former residents 
 Knute Rockne
 George Gipp
 Harry Stuhldreher
 Don Miller
 Jim Crowley
Gus Dorias
Curly Lambeau
 Fr. Edward A. Malloy, C.S.C
 Elmer Layden
 John Francis O'Hara, C.S.C
 Rocky Bleier
 Dave Casper
 Fr. John I. Jenkins, C.S.C
 Ken MacAfee
 Jed York'2003
 Golden Tate
 Gabby Gabreski
James A. Burns, C. S. C.

References

Other sources
 Bellairsia
 The Observer
 South Bend Tribune on Sorin
 Chicago Tribune
 LA Times

External links
 Sorin Hall Website
 Sorin Hall Profile at the Office of Residence Life and Housing
 University of Notre Dame Website

1888 establishments in Indiana
University of Notre Dame residence halls
University of Notre Dame buildings and structures
National Register of Historic Places in St. Joseph County, Indiana
Historic district contributing properties in Indiana
University and college buildings on the National Register of Historic Places in Indiana